Gabriel Fernando de Jesus (born 3 April 1997) is a Brazilian professional footballer who plays as a forward for  club Arsenal and the Brazil national team.

Jesus began his senior club career at Palmeiras, where he was voted Best Newcomer at the 2015 Campeonato Brasileiro Série A and won the Copa do Brasil. In 2016, he won the Bola de Ouro helping Palmeiras win their first national league title in 22 years. Jesus signed with English club Manchester City in January 2017 in a transfer worth £27 million, and won four Premier League titles, three EFL Cups, and the FA Cup. In July 2022, he joined Arsenal in a deal worth £45 million.

After winning 21 caps and scoring 7 goals at youth level, including reaching the final of the 2015 FIFA U-20 World Cup and winning an Olympic gold medal at the 2016 Summer Olympics, Jesus made his senior debut for Brazil in September 2016. He was part of the squad that took part at the FIFA World Cup in 2018 and 2022, also participating at the Copa América in 2019 and 2021, winning the former tournament.

Early life
Born in São Paulo, Jesus grew up in the neighbourhood of Jardim Peri, in poor conditions as his mother was a single mother to him and his two brothers. After initially playing street football, he joined amateur clubs in the region, his last one being Associação Atlética Anhanguera.

Club career

Palmeiras

On 1 July 2013, Jesus signed a youth contract with Palmeiras. He was also the club's top goalscorer during the year, scoring 54 goals in 48 matches.

In January 2014, after lengthy negotiations, Jesus signed a three-year contract for Palmeiras with an additional two, with his salary to increase from R$15,000 to four times as much in the fifth year; the fee to buy him out from his contract increased tenfold to R$30 million. However, the deal changed the balance of his economic rights from 75 to 25% in favour of Palmeiras, to 70–30% in favour of his agents.

Jesus scored 37 goals in 22 games for Palmeiras in the 2014 edition of the state under-17 championship, leading to offers from clubs throughout the country and abroad. He was first included in Palmeiras' squad for a senior match on 27 August 2014, remaining an unused substitute as they lost 0–1 at home to Clube Atlético Mineiro in the first leg of the last 16 of the year's Copa do Brasil. He did not make any senior appearances during the campaign, as his side was seriously threatened with relegation; this decision, took by managers Ricardo Gareca and Dorival Júnior, was widely criticized by the supporters, who demanded a change for the youngster through a petition.

Jesus made his senior debut on 7 March 2015 in the season's Campeonato Paulista, replacing Leandro Pereira in the 73rd minute of a 1–0 win over CA Bragantino at Allianz Parque. He totalled eight appearances, all off the bench, as the Verdão lost on a penalty shoot-out in the final against Santos. Jesus made his first career start on 29 April in the second leg of the second round of the year's cup, a 1–1 draw at Sampaio Corrêa Futebol Clube (6–2 aggregate). On 9 May, he made his first appearance in the Campeonato Brasileiro Série A, starting in a 2–2 home draw against Atlético Mineiro on the first day of the season.

Jesus' first professional goal came in the next round of the cup, away to Agremiação Sportiva Arapiraquense on 15 July, the only goal of the two-legged tie. On 26 August, his two first-half strikes at the Estádio Governador Magalhães Pinto gave Palmeiras a 3–2 win over Cruzeiro Esporte Clube (5–3 aggregate), putting them into the quarter-finals. Four days later he got his first league goals, starting and finishing a 3–2 win over Joinville Esporte Clube; the first goal came after 52 seconds. Jesus finished the campaign with four goals from 20 games, and his team defeated Santos to win the cup; he was also a starter in both legs of the finals, but being substituted before half-time due to a shoulder injury. He was elected Best Newcomer in the league.

On 4 February 2016, Jesus scored his first Paulista goal, opening a 2–2 home draw with Esporte Clube São Bento in the second game of the season. Twelve days later, he scored his first goal in continental football, a 2–2 draw away to Uruguay's River Plate in the opening game of the group stage of the year's Copa Libertadores, after coming on at the interval in place of fellow youngster Erik Lima. Away to Rosario Central on 6 April, he scored twice in a 3–3 draw but was sent off for the first time in his career for fighting with Damián Musto; he later apologised for his misconduct.

In the opening game of the national season at home to Clube Atlético Paranaense on 14 May, Jesus scored twice in the second half of a 4–0 win. He scored 12 goals as the team won their first national championship since 1994, and was named Bola de Ouro for player of the season.

Manchester City

On 3 August 2016, it was announced that Jesus would sign for Premier League club Manchester City in January 2017 on a contract until the summer of 2021. City paid a reported fee of £27 million/€33 million, plus add-ons. The transfer was fully completed on 19 January 2017.

Jesus made his first Premier League appearance on 21 January, coming on as an 82nd-minute substitute for Raheem Sterling in a 2–2 draw with Tottenham Hotspur at the City of Manchester Stadium. A week later, Jesus made his first appearance in Manchester City's starting XI, assisting a goal for Sterling in a 3–0 FA Cup win over Crystal Palace. On 1 February he made his first Premier League start in place of Sergio Agüero, and assisted Kevin De Bruyne in the 17th minute and then scored his first goal for the club in the 39th. With this, he became the first Manchester City player to have a goal and an assist in their first Premier League start, as well as only the third City player to be involved in two or more goals in their first Premier League start. In his fourth game (third league start) Jesus broke a metatarsal in his right foot and was expected to be out for the remainder of the 2016–17 Premier League season. However, he returned in April for the Manchester Derby, coming on as a substitute in a goalless draw. Jesus ended the 2016–17 season with seven goals and four assists in 11 games.

He scored his first Premier League goal of the 2017–18 season on 26 August, an equaliser in a 2–1 away win over Bournemouth, and added two more in a 5–0 win against Liverpool on 9 September. He had a 14-game goal drought between 18 November 2017 and 7 March 2018 that encompassed a knee medial ligament injury on New Year's Eve, and after breaking his duck in the Champions League loss to FC Basel he admitted that fear of getting injured was affecting his game. Jesus scored the last Premier League goal in the 2017–18 season against Southampton in the 94th minute, to secure City a league record 100 points. On 3 August 2018, Jesus signed a contract extension with Manchester City, to take him up until 2023.
On 9 January 2019, Gabriel Jesus scored four goals for the first time in his career against Burton Albion in a 9–0 victory.

On 13 March 2019, Jesus scored once after coming on for Sergio Agüero in the 7–0 (10–2 aggregate) UEFA Champions League Round of 16 win over Schalke 04 and in doing so helped the club equal the record for the largest winning margin in the knockout phase of the competition. On 22 June, Jesus switched his jersey number from the number '33' shirt to the number '9' shirt.

On 7 August 2020, Jesus assisted and scored both goals respectively in a 2–1 win in the second leg of the round of 16 of the Champions League against Real Madrid, played at the Etihad Stadium behind closed doors following the Coronavirus outbreak. Both goals were scored after Jesus' pressing forced two errors from Real Madrid defender Raphael Varane, sealing Manchester City's spot in the quarter-finals. He was the only player to score in two separate games against Real Madrid in the 2019–2020 football season, having also scored in the first leg in Madrid. This meant he reached 14 goals in only 22 Champions League games, a record bettered by only three non-European players.

On 23 April 2022, Jesus scored four goals in a 5–1 home win over Watford, sealing his first Premier League hat-trick.

Arsenal 
On 4 July 2022, Jesus signed a long-term contract with Arsenal, and was assigned the number 9 shirt. The fee and the duration of the contract were undisclosed, yet it was reported the Brazilian signed a five-year contract on a £45 million deal. On 5 August, he made his club debut in a 2–0 away win against Crystal Palace in the Premier League. On 13 August, in his second match and first at the Emirates, he scored his first and second competitive goals for the club against Leicester City and also provided two assists in a 4–2 win.

On 12 March 2023, he made his first appearance since recovering from the knee injury he sustained in the 2022 FIFA World Cup, replacing Leandro Trossard in the 77th minute of Arsenal's win at Fulham.

International career

Jesus was part of the Brazil under-20 team that finished as runners-up at the 2015 U-20 World Cup in New Zealand. He scored their first goal of the tournament in a 4–2 win over Nigeria in New Plymouth, and converted as they advanced past Uruguay and Portugal on penalties.

In 2016, he was chosen in Dunga's provisional 40-man squad for the Copa América Centenario in the United States, and was considered as a replacement for the injured Douglas Costa in the final selection but missed out through the lack of a U.S. visa. Later that year, he was one of five forwards named in the squad for the team's hosting of the Olympic tournament. He scored once against Danish keeper Jeppe Højbjerg in their final group game against Denmark, an eventual 4–0 win, and in the semi-final against Honduras he added two more in a 6–0 victory. Jesus won the Olympics with his team against Germany in a penalty shoot-out, scoring one of the penalties.

Jesus made his debut for the senior team on 1 September 2016, in a 2018 FIFA World Cup qualification game against Ecuador in Quito. He started the match and scored twice, as Brazil won 3–0. Jesus was Brazil's highest scorer in the CONMEBOL World Cup qualifiers, with 7 goals in 10 matches.
In May 2018, he was named in Tite's final 23-man squad for the 2018 FIFA World Cup in Russia. Jesus started all five games for Brazil at the tournament without scoring a goal.

In May 2019, Jesus was included in Brazil's 23-man squad for the 2019 Copa América on home soil. In the final against Peru on 7 July, at the Maracanã Stadium, he assisted the opening goal scored by Everton Soares, and later scored the match-winning goal late in the first half; however, he was sent off in the second half after collecting a second yellow card during the final following a collision with Carlos Zambrano. Brazil won the match 3–1 to win the title. In August 2019, Jesus was handed a 2-month international ban from CONMEBOL, due to his behavior after being red carded in the 2019 Copa América Final.

In June 2021, he was included in Brazil's squad for the 2021 Copa América on home soil.

On 7 November 2022, Jesus was named in the squad for the 2022 FIFA World Cup. He was ruled out for the rest of the competition after picking up a right knee injury in the final group stage match against Cameroon.

Style of play
A talented and versatile forward, Jesus is capable of playing in several attacking positions: he has been deployed as a center forward, as an out-and-out striker, as a false 9, as an inside forward, as a winger or as an attacking midfielder. Jesus is renowned for his pace, technical skills, dribbling ability, creativity, finishing, movement, and work ethic. Former Brazilian striker Ronaldo has praised Jesus and touted him for future success with the Brazilian national team. He has been praised by Manchester City’s Pep Guardiola that of the players he has worked with, he is the ‘best striker/defender’.

In October 2019, Jesus said he was open to switching to a winger role at Manchester City in the hope of getting more playing time, though he acknowledged that there was still intense competition in the team for a starting spot out on the wing.

Upon joining Arsenal, Jesus has been placed up-front as a striker in a 4-3-3 formation.

Personal life
Gabriel Jesus came to England with his mother and older brother, along with two friends. He comes from a religious family and reportedly chose to wear the number 33 in tribute to the age at which Jesus Christ is believed to have been crucified. He and Neymar got matching tattoos in August 2016 depicting a boy overlooking a favela.

Appearing in EA Sports' FIFA video game series, Jesus's goal celebration – ‘Alô-mãe’ ("Hello, mother" in English), where he makes a telephone gesture – features in FIFA 19.

On 25 September 2021, after scoring the only goal in a victory against Chelsea, Jesus announced he was expecting his first child with his partner  .  On 24 May 2022 just less than forty-eight hours after  Manchester City’s title triumph at the Etihad Stadium a baby daughter Helena Jesus was born.

Career statistics

Club

International

Scores and results list Brazil's goal tally first, score column indicates score after each Jesus goal.

Honours
Palmeiras
Campeonato Brasileiro Série A: 2016
Copa do Brasil: 2015

Manchester City
Premier League: 2017–18, 2018–19, 2020–21, 2021–22
FA Cup: 2018–19
EFL Cup: 2017–18, 2019–20, 2020–21
FA Community Shield: 2018, 2019
UEFA Champions League runner-up: 2020–21

Brazil U23
Olympic Gold Medal: 2016

Brazil
Copa América: 2019

Individual
Campeonato Brasileiro Série A Best Newcomer: 2015
Campeonato Brasileiro Série A Best Player: 2016
Campeonato Brasileiro Série A Team of the Year: 2016
Bola de Ouro: 2016
Bola de Prata: 2016

References

External links

Gabriel Jesus at the Arsenal F.C. website
Gabriel Jesus at the Premier League website

1997 births
Living people
Footballers from São Paulo
Brazilian footballers
Association football forwards
Sociedade Esportiva Palmeiras players
Manchester City F.C. players
Arsenal F.C. players
Campeonato Brasileiro Série A players
Premier League players
FA Cup Final players
Brazil youth international footballers
Brazil under-20 international footballers
Brazil international footballers
2018 FIFA World Cup players
2019 Copa América players
2021 Copa América players
2022 FIFA World Cup players
Copa América-winning players
Olympic footballers of Brazil
Footballers at the 2016 Summer Olympics
Olympic gold medalists for Brazil
Olympic medalists in football
Medalists at the 2016 Summer Olympics
Brazilian expatriate footballers
Expatriate footballers in England
Brazilian expatriate sportspeople in England